This is a list of monarchs of Württemberg, containing the Counts, Dukes, Electors, and Kings who reigned over different territories named Württemberg from the beginning of the County of Württemberg in the 11th century to the end of the Kingdom of Württemberg in 1918.

Counts and Dukes of Württemberg

House of Württemberg

Partitions of Württemberg under Württemberg rule

Table of monarchs

Elector of Württemberg, 1803–1806 

In 1803, the Duke of Württemberg was raised to the rank of Elector of the Holy Roman Empire. In 1806, the Empire was dissolved, and the Elector of Württemberg became an independent monarch with the title of King.

Kings of Württemberg, 1806–1918 

The Holy Roman Empire came to an end in 1806. The Elector of Württemberg, allied to Napoleon I, anticipated its dissolution by becoming the ruler of an independent Kingdom of Württemberg in 1806.

Because of a lack of male heirs under Salic law, on the death of Wilhelm II in 1921 the royal house had to reach back to the descendants of Friedrich II Eugen (ruled 1795–97). The line of the Duke of Urach was excluded because of a morganatic marriage back in 1800 by its forebear Duke William, and so the succession devolved to the younger branch of Altshausen.

Another morganatic descendant of Friedrich II Eugen was Mary of Teck (1867–1953), who married the British king George V when he was Duke of York.

See also 
 List of Ministers-President of Baden-Württemberg#Presidents of the Free People's State of Württemberg (1918–1945)
 House of Württemberg
 History of Baden-Württemberg
 Coat of arms of Württemberg

References

Rulers of Württemberg
Württembergian nobility
Wurttembergian rulers
Wurttembergian dukes
Lists of German nobility